Protein N-terminal glutamine amidohydrolase is an enzyme that in humans is encoded by the WDYHV1 gene.

References

Further reading

External links